is a Japanese football player who plays as an attacking midfielder for Sanfrecce Hiroshima and the Japan national team.

Club statistics

1Includes Japanese Super Cup and FIFA Club World Cup.

Honours
Sanfrecce Hiroshima
J. League Division 1 (2) : 2012, 2013
 J.League Cup (1) : 2022
Japanese Super Cup (2) : 2013, 2014

References

External links

Profile at Vegalta Sendai
Profile at Shimizu S-Pulse

1994 births
Living people
Association football people from Hiroshima Prefecture
Japanese footballers
Japan youth international footballers
J1 League players
J3 League players
Sanfrecce Hiroshima players
Albirex Niigata players
Shimizu S-Pulse players
J.League U-22 Selection players
Vegalta Sendai players
Footballers at the 2014 Asian Games
Association football midfielders
Asian Games competitors for Japan